The Furse Argillaceous Beds is a geologic formation in Scotland. It preserves fossils dating back to the Devonian period.

See also

 List of fossiliferous stratigraphic units in Scotland

References
 

Geologic formations of Scotland
Devonian System of Europe
Devonian Scotland